John Mamoru Fujioka (June 29, 1925 – December 13, 2018) was an American actor of Japanese descent. He was particularly known for performing the role of a Japanese holdout soldier in The Last Flight of Noah's Ark, Who Finds a Friend Finds a Treasure, and American Ninja. He died in December 2018 at the age of 93.

Partial filmography
 1962 Confessions of an Opium Eater as Auctioneer
 1962 A Girl Named Tamiko as Minya
 1963 The Rifleman (TV Series) as Hikaru Yamanaka
 1964 McHale's Navy as Japanese J.G. 
 1973 Submersion of Japan as Narita
 1975 Six Million Dollar Man (TV Series) as Kuroda
 1976 Midway as Rear Admiral Tamon Yamaguchi
 1976 Futureworld as Mr. Takaguchi
 1980 The Private Eyes as Mr. Uwatsum
 1980 The Last Flight of Noah's Ark as Cleveland
 1980 The Octagon as Master Isawa
 1981 Who Finds a Friend Finds a Treasure as Kamasuka
 1982 Some Kind of Hero as Captain Tan Tai
 1982 They Call Me Bruce? as Master
 1985 American Ninja as Shinyuki
 1986 Body Slam as Mr. Kim
 1987 Steel Dawn as Cord
 1988 The Last Samurai as Yasujiro Endo
 1989 Paint It Black as Mr. Lee
 1990 Martial Law as Chang
 1990 Friday the 13th: The Series (TV Series) as Sensei Musashi
 1991 V.I. Warshawski as Sumitora
 1992 American Samurai as Tatsuya Sanga
 1993 American Yakuza as Isshin Tendo
 1995 Mortal Kombat as Chief Priest
 1997 Tear It Down
 2001 Pearl Harbor as Nishikura

External links

References

1925 births
2018 deaths
20th-century American male actors
American male actors of Japanese descent
American male film actors
American film actors of Asian descent